30 Pashons - Coptic calendar - 2 Paoni

Fixed commemorations
All fixed commemorations below are observed on 1 Paoni (8 June) by the Coptic Orthodox Church.

Saints
Saint Cosmas of Taha and his companions

Commemorations
Consecration of the church of Saint Leontius
Consecration of the church of Saint Phoebammon

References
Coptic Synexarion

Days of the Coptic calendar